Adam and the Serpent is a 1946 Argentine film directed by Carlos Hugo Christensen and written by Aldo De Benedetti. The film starred Olga Casares Pearson, Alberto de Mendoza and Olga Zubarry.

Cast
Olga Casares Pearson
Alberto de Mendoza
Yeya Duciel
Tito Gómez
Rita Juárez
Ivonne Lescaut
Diego Martínez
Iris Martorell
Héctor Méndez
Gonzalo Palomero
Santiago Rebull
Enrique Serrano
Juan Siches de Alarcón
Tilda Thamar
Olga Zubarry

External links

1946 films
Argentine black-and-white films
Films directed by Carlos Hugo Christensen
1940s Argentine films